Cody is a series of six Australian telemovies starring Gary Sweet that were made for the Seven Network in 1994 and 1995. Sweet played the title character Cody, an unconventional police detective, described by Screen Australia as a "larrikin cop, on the trail of crimes".

Plot
Cody (Gary Sweet) is a Sydney-based police detective, with Fiorelli (Robert Mammone) as his partner and Inspector Genevieve Simmonds (Heather Mitchell) as their superior. In September 1994 Sweet described the title character to Nicole Leedham of The Canberra Times as "kind of risky and dangerous and pretty ruthless ... [He] ain't that much fun, I mean he's fun to play, but he's not that much fun as a guy. He's not your barrel of laughs."

In the first episode, Cody: A Family Affair (1994), the detective investigates a diamond-smuggling gang and poses as a dealer. He also searches for a missing teenager.

In the second episode, Cody: The Tipoff (1994), Cody's childhood friend Mack (Gary Waddell) provides a tip about a burglary in progress. Mack later turns up dead and Cody investigates another friend, Jimmy Catter (Frankie J. Holden).

In the third episode, Cody: Bad Love (1994), the squad's investigation of art thefts leads to a gallery run by an attractive French artist, Claudia (Rebecca Rigg).

The fourth episode, Cody: The Burnout (1995), includes Stella (Alexandra Fowler).

In the fifth episode, Cody: The Wrong Stuff (1995), the squad hunts a drug dealer (Mark Owen-Taylor).

In the sixth episode, Cody: Fall from Grace (1995), an apparent suicide leads to Sam Wolfe (Bill Hunter).

Cast
 Gary Sweet as Cody 
 Robert Mammone as Fiorelli 
 Heather Mitchell as Inspector Genevieve Simmonds (episodes 1–3)
 Suzanne Gullabovska  as Girl in Lift (The Tip-Off)

Episodes

Season One

Season Two

Home media 

It was announced by Via Vision Entertainment in March 2019 that they would be releasing the Cody telemovies on DVD in two collections.

Awards and nominations
Gary Sweet was nominated for a Silver Logie as Most Popular Actor for the episode, Cody: The Burnout.

See also
 List of Australian television series
 AACTA Award for Best Telefeature, Mini Series or Short Run Series

References

Australian drama television series
Seven Network original programming
1994 Australian television series debuts
1995 Australian television series endings
Television series by Endemol Australia